Mezőkövesdi Kézilabda Club  is a Hungarian handball club from Mezőkövesd, that played in the  Nemzeti Bajnokság I, the top level championship in Hungary.

Crest, colours, supporters

Naming history

Kit manufacturers and Shirt sponsor
The following table shows in detail Mezőkövesdi Kézilabda Club kit manufacturers and shirt sponsors by year:

Kits

Supporters and rivalries
The supporters of the club are based in Mezőkövesd, in Borsod-Abaúj-Zemplén County, Hungary.

Mezőkövesdi KC's arch-rival is the neighbouring club Eger-Eszterházy SzSE and games between the clubs are considered as the "Bükkaljai derbi".
Mezőkövesdi KC's arch-rival is the neighbouring club Gyöngyösi KK and games between the clubs.

Sports Hall information

Name: – Városi Sportcsarnok
City: – Mezőkövesd
Capacity: – 850
Address: – 3400 Mezőkövesd, Kavicsos tó út 9.

Management

Team

Current squad 

Squad for the 2022–23 season

Technical staff
 Head Coach:  Péter Drizner
 Masseur:  Ágnes Póta Lázárné

Transfers
Transfers for the 2022–23 season

Joining 

Leaving 
  Kristóf Csörgő (CB) to  Ferencvárosi TC

Previous Squads

Top Scorers

Honours

Recent seasons

Seasons in Nemzeti Bajnokság I: 9
Seasons in Nemzeti Bajnokság I/B: 7
Seasons in Nemzeti Bajnokság II: 8

EHF ranking

Former club members

Notable former players

 Ádám Bajorhegyi
 János Bécsi
 László Fekete
 Patrick Gyuris
 Gábor Hajdú
 Balázs Holló
 Károly Juhász
 Attila Kotormán
 Szilveszter Liszkai
 Ferenc Molnár
 Péter Pallag
 Gábor Pálos
 István Rosta
 Miklós Rosta
 Ákos Sándor
 István Szepesi
 Marko Vasić
 Nikola Džono
 Faruk Halilbegović
 Stanko Stanković
 Stanislav Nakhaenko
 Artsiom Selvasiuk
 Henrique Pedro Martins
 Alencar Cassiano Rossoni
 Rudolf Ćužić
 Jure Kozina
 Matija Pavlović
 Tomislav Radnić
 Mate Volarević
 Marko Vukić
 Saeid Pourghasemi
 Atsushi Mekaru
 Filip Krivokapić
 Mirko Vujovic
 Aleksey Grigoriev
 Dušan Bozoljac
 Aleksandar Ćirić
 Goran Đukić
 Stefan Ilić
 Igor Milicevic
 Milos Mojsilov
 Petar Papić
 Predrag Rodić
 Darko Trivković
 Nebojsa Vojinovic
 Lukas Gamrat
 Marian Kleis
 Marek Kovácech
 Michal Melus
 Tomáš Szűcs

Former coaches

References

External links
 Official website  
 

Hungarian handball clubs
Sport in Borsod-Abaúj-Zemplén County